Great Witcombe is a village and civil parish  south east of Gloucester, in the Tewkesbury district, in the county of Gloucestershire, England. In 2001 the parish had a population of 80. The parish touches Badgeworth, Brimpsfield, Brockworth, Cowley and Cranham.

Landmarks 
There are 17 listed buildings in Great Witcombe. Great Witcombe has a church called St Mary. The parish includes the remains of Great Witcombe Roman Villa.

History 
The name "Witcombe" means 'Wide valley'.

References

External links 

 

Villages in Gloucestershire
Civil parishes in Gloucestershire
Borough of Tewkesbury